Digby is the short name of American political blogger Heather Digby Parton from Santa Monica, California who founded the blog Hullabaloo. She has been called one of the "leading and most admired commentators" of the liberal/progressive blogosphere.

Digby began as a commenter on the blogs of Bartcop and Atrios and launched her own blog on January 1, 2003, calling it Hullabaloo "because one function of blogs is to cause a ruckus" and decorating it with a picture of a screaming Howard Beale from the film Network.  She has been joined by other bloggers on Hullabaloo, including composer Richard Einhorn, who blogs under the name "Tristero".

Digby graduated from Lathrop High School in Fairbanks, Alaska. She studied theater at San Jose State University (then known as San Jose State College) and worked on the Trans-Alaska Pipeline System and for a number of film companies, including Island Pictures, PolyGram, and Artisan Entertainment.

Digby won the 2005 Koufax award for blog writing and accepted the Paul Wellstone Award on behalf of the progressive blogosphere from the Campaign for America's Future (CAF) at their "Take Back America" conference.  Digby had initially kept her identity secret and it was widely assumed that Digby was male until she made an appearance at the 2007 CAF conference to accept the award. Digby has since written regularly at Salon under her given name of Heather Digby Parton. She also won the 2014 Hillman Prize for Opinion and Analysis Journalism.

References

External links

Year of birth missing (living people)
American bloggers
American women journalists
Living people
Salon (website) people
21st-century American non-fiction writers
American women bloggers
21st-century American women writers